The 2011 New York City Marathon was the 42nd running of the annual marathon race in New York City, United States, which took place on Sunday, November 6. Sponsored by ING Group, it was the final race of the 2010/11 World Marathon Majors series and an IAAF Gold Label Road Race. Geoffrey Mutai of Kenya won the men's elite race in a course record time of 2:05:06 hours while Ethiopia's Firehiwot Dado won the women's section in a time of 2:23:15.

In the wheelchair races, Japan's Masazumi Soejima (1:31:41) and America's Amanda McGrory (1:50:24) won the men's and women's divisions, respectively. In the handcycle race, former racing driver Alex Zanardi of Italy won the men's race in 1:13:58 while Poland's Renata Kaluza took the women's title in 1:49:49.

A then-record high of 47,107 runners entered the competition, with a total of 46,536 runners finishing the distance (29,669 men and 16,867 women). At this race Joy Johnson became the oldest female marathon finisher at age 84.

Results

Men

Ezkyas Sisay of Ethiopia originally placed ninth in a time of 2:11:04 hours, but was subsequently disqualified for doping.

Women

Wheelchair men

Wheelchair women

Handcycle men

Handcycle women

References

Results
ING New York City Marathon 2011. New York Road Runners. Retrieved 2020-05-09.
Men's results. Association of Road Racing Statisticians. Retrieved 2020-04-11.
Women's results. Association of Road Racing Statisticians. Retrieved 2020-04-11.

External links

New York Road Runners website

2011
New York City
Marathon
New York City Marathon